= Cross-country skiing at the 2007 Canada Games =

Cross-country skiing (or Nordic skiing) at the 2007 Canada Games consisted of Relay, 1200m Sprint, Classic Interval, and Mass Start Freestyle events. These events were held on 300 metre, 3.3 km, 3.75 km and 5 km loops at the Mount McIntyre Recreation Centre in Whitehorse.

== Relay ==
Medal	Men's 4×5 km	Time	Women's 4×3.75 km	Time
Gold	Ontario	52:27.50	Alberta	52:56.60
Silver	Alberta	52:54.10	Ontario	53:42.80
Bronze	British Columbia	53:04.60	Yukon Emily Nishikawa, Bryn Knight, Heidi O'Connor-Brook, Janelle Greer	53:37.30 (Note: The Whitehorse Star reported this as 55:37:30.)

== 1200m Sprint ==
Medal	Men's	Time	Women's	Time
Gold	(British Columbia) Christopher Lyle Werrell	2:21.52	(Alberta) Cathy Jaques	2:58.10
Silver	(Quebec) Nicolas Poirier	2:28.81	(Alberta) Heidi Andrea Widmer	3:01.68
Bronze	(British Columbia) Cameron Patrick Egan	2:22.37	(Alberta) Marlis Yvonne Kromm	3:06.43

== Race (Classic, interval) ==
Medal	Men's 10 km	Time	Women's 7.5 km	Time
Gold	(Yukon) David William Lane Greer	27:01.30	(Alberta) Marcia Rita Birkigt	22:59.40
Silver	(Alberta) Curtis Sunil Merry	27:54.30	(British Columbia) Alysson Flora Marshall	23:23.80
Bronze	(Alberta) Graeme Wesley Killick	27:54.40	(Yukon) Jennifer Bryn Knight	23:32.60

== Race (Free, mass start) ==
Medal	Men's 15 km	Time	Women's 10 km	Time
Gold	(Northwest Territories) Brendan Joseph Green	43:14.70	(British Columbia) Alysson Flora Marshall	36:49.00
Silver	(Ontario) Gavin Michael Hamilton	43:15.80	(Alberta) Marlis Yvonne Kromm	36:49.40
Bronze	(Alberta) Curtis Sunil Merry	43:17.90	(Ontario) Alana Jane Deakin Thomas	36:50.00
